Barbara Kunkel (born 17 September 1969) is an American taekwondo practitioner. She competed at the 2000 Summer Olympics in Sydney. She won a bronze medal in middleweight at the 1999 Pan American Games.

References

External links

1969 births
Living people
American female taekwondo practitioners
Olympic taekwondo practitioners of the United States
Taekwondo practitioners at the 2000 Summer Olympics
Pan American Games medalists in taekwondo
Pan American Games bronze medalists for the United States
Taekwondo practitioners at the 1999 Pan American Games
Medalists at the 1999 Pan American Games
21st-century American women